Tom & Viv is a play written by English playwright Michael Hastings. The play is based on the real life of T. S. Eliot and his wife Vivienne Haigh-Wood Eliot.

To write the play,  Hastings spent many months conducting interviews with friends and family of the Eliots who were still alive and read through the letters left behind from the family. The play received some controversy over painting T.S. Eliot in a less than flattering light over his treatment of his wife while she was in poor health. Hastings died in 2011.

Synopsis
The play begins with the beginning of the courtship between T.S. Eliot and Vivienne Haigh-Wood in 1914 and ends with their separation in 1933 and Vivienne's gradual mental health decline until her death in 1947. The play also follows the early career of T.S. Eliot, the death of Vivienne's father, and how her mother Rose dealt with her daughter's failing marriage and mental health.

Historical casting

Performance history
The play premiered in 1984 at the Royal Court Theatre. The same cast, except for Wilkinson who was replaced by Edward Herrmann, traveled to New York and the play was staged at The Public Theater. The play did not transfer to Broadway, and instead returned to London for a short run.

In 2006, the first major revival was staged at the Almeida Theatre starring Frances O'Connor, Will Keen, and Anna Carteret.

In 2010, a production was staged at Wadham College in Oxford.

Adaptations and awards
The play was adapted as a film by Hastings and Adrian Hodges with of the same name in 1993 and released in 1994 by the Weinstein Company. The film received acclaim and Miranda Richardson was nominated for the Academy Award for Best Actress and Rosemary Harris was nominated for the Academy Award for Best Supporting Actress.

For the Royal Court Theatre run, Julie Covington was nominated for the Laurence Olivier Award for Actress of the Year in a New Play.

For the original Off-broadway run, Margaret Tyzack was nominated for the Drama Desk Award for Outstanding Featured Actress in a Play.

The play script was first published in 1985 by Penguin Books, it was revised in 1992 with additional notes, and in 2000 it was revised and released by Oberon Books.

BBC adapted the play as an audiobook starring Benedict Cumberbatch as T.S. Eliot, Lia Williams as Vivienne, David Haig as Maurice and Judy Parfitt as Rose.

References

External links
 

British plays
Off-Broadway plays
1984 plays
Plays based on real people
Plays set in the 1910s
Plays set in the 1920s
Plays set in the 1930s
Plays set in the 1940s
Plays set in the United Kingdom
T. S. Eliot